On the Line: Original Motion Picture Soundtrack is the soundtrack album to the film of the same name. It was released on October 16, 2001, via Jive Records.

Critical reception

AllMusic's Heather Phares was critical of the tracks performed by BBMak, Robyn and Jessica Folkner, and found the production choices on the remake of Al Green's "Let's Stay Together" to be "an insult to his talent." She commended the contributions from both *NSYNC and Britney Spears, along with the songs by Trickside and Melissa Lefton, but said that "these moments are few and far between on On the Line, a soundtrack that seems more concerned with the bottom line than worthwhile music." Kristen Baldwin of Entertainment Weekly remarked that "Kids dissed Lance Bass and Joey Fatone's feature film debut, On the Line, but they'll probably plunk down babysitting dough for this compilation of homogeneous pop."

Track listing

Charts

References 

2001 soundtrack albums
Comedy film soundtracks
Jive Records soundtracks
NSYNC
Albums produced by Desmond Child
Albums produced by Kristian Lundin
Albums produced by Richard Marx